This is a list of computer programs that use Monte Carlo methods for molecular modeling.

 Abalone classical Hybrid MC
 BOSS classical
 Cassandra classical
 CP2K
 FEASST classical 
 GOMC classical 
 MacroModel classical
 Materials Studio classical
 ms2classical
RASPA classical
 QMCPACK quantum
 Spartan classical
 Tinker classical
 Towhee classical

See also 
 List of quantum chemistry and solid state physics software
 Comparison of software for molecular mechanics modeling
 Comparison of nucleic acid simulation software
 Molecular design software
 Molecule editor

References

Molecular modelling software
Monte Carlo molecular modelling software